Frances Louise Bertram (later Hulbig, March 30, 1908 – October 18, 1996) was a Canadian pair skater.

She was born in Toronto, Ontario to Robert McKenzie Bertram and Louisa Hope Hodgens.

As Louise Bertram, she and her partner, Stewart Reburn, were dubbed "the Fred Astaire and Ginger Rogers of the ice world" and were Canadian seniors pairs champions in 1935.

Her partnership with Reburn ended in 1938 when he was spotted by world champion Norwegian skater Sonja Henie.

The professional skating career of Louise Bertram ended shortly after that when she married Sidney Hulbig.

In 2015, Reburn and Bertram were inducted into the Skate Canada Hall of Fame, in the athlete category, in its 25th anniversary year.

Competitive highlights
(with Stewart Reburn)

References

 

1908 births
2006 deaths
Canadian female pair skaters
Figure skaters at the 1936 Winter Olympics
Olympic figure skaters of Canada
Figure skaters from Toronto